Abdus Sami Faridi (born 7 September 1983) is a Saudi Arabian-born cricketer who has played three One Day Internationals for Canada.

External links 

1983 births
Living people
Canada One Day International cricketers
Canadian cricketers
Sami
Sami
Sami
Karachi Blues cricketers